Willy Angst (born 20 November 1913, date of death unknown) was a Swiss wrestler. He competed at the 1936 Summer Olympics and the 1948 Summer Olympics.

References

External links
 

1913 births
Year of death missing
Swiss male sport wrestlers
Olympic wrestlers of Switzerland
Wrestlers at the 1936 Summer Olympics
Wrestlers at the 1948 Summer Olympics
Place of birth missing